Brennan Othmann (born January 5, 2003) is a Canadian-Swiss ice hockey winger for the Peterborough Petes of the Ontario Hockey League (OHL) as a prospect to the New York Rangers of the National Hockey League (NHL). He was drafted in the first round, 16th overall, by the Rangers in the 2021 NHL Entry Draft.

Playing career
Othmann played for the Flint Firebirds of the Ontario Hockey League (OHL) in the 2019–20 season, and when the OHL shut down for the 2020–21 season he played for EHC Olten of the Swiss League. In the 2021 NHL Entry Draft, he was selected by the New York Rangers. On August 12, 2021, Othmann signed a three-year, entry-level contract with the Rangers.  He was assigned back to Flint after an impressive 2021 training camp with the Rangers.

After registering 50 goals and 47 assists for Flint in 2021–22, Othmann was named the OHL's First Team All-Star left wing. Despite playing impressively at the Rangers 2022 training camp, Othmann was sent back to Flint, and was chosen by the media as the winner of the Lars-Erik Sjoberg Award for being the Rangers' best rookie at training camp. Othmann was traded to the Peterborough Petes  on November 12, 2022.

International play

 

Despite the excellent 2021–22 season, Othmann was not included on Team Canada for the originally-scheduled 2022 World Junior Ice Hockey Championships in December 2021 through January 2022.  After the original tournament was cancelled due to the Omicron variant, Othmann was selected for the rescheduled tournament in August of 2022. Team Canada won the gold medal.  Othmann said of playing on Team Canada with fellow Rangers' prospects Will Cuylle and Dylan Garand "It was a lot of fun, for sure. I think that you get to know them a little bit more. We got to know G a little bit, he’s a different character. You have to ask Cools about him. He’s a lot of fun and Cools and I built a good friendship, bonded out there, too. It’s two great guys, two guys I’ll be growing up with for the rest of my life, hopefully. I was very fortunate to have that with them."

On December 12, 2022, Othmann was again named to Team Canada to compete at the 2023 World Junior Ice Hockey Championships. During the tournament he recorded two goals and four assists in seven games and won a gold medal.

Career statistics

Regular season and playoffs

International

Awards and honours

References

External links
 

2003 births
Living people
Canadian ice hockey left wingers
EHC Olten players
Flint Firebirds players
National Hockey League first-round draft picks
New York Rangers draft picks
Peterborough Petes (ice hockey) players
Sportspeople from Scarborough, Toronto
Ice hockey people from Toronto